Faisal Al Sayegh is a Lebanese Druze politician. He was born in 1961. In 1983 he obtained a bachelor's degree in Economics from the American University of Beirut.

Al Sayegh left the Lebanese Democratic Party in 2004. He was elected to parliament from the Aley-Baabda constituency in the 2005 Lebanese general election, being a candidate on the Democratic Gathering list.

References

1961 births
Living people
Members of the Parliament of Lebanon